La Secchia Rapita (The kidnapped bucket) is a mock-heroic epic poem by Alessandro Tassoni, first published in 1622. Later successful mock-heroic works in French and English were written on the same plan.

Background
The invention of the heroic-comic poem in the Baroque period is usually ascribed to Alessandro Tassoni who, in 1622, published in Paris a poem entitled La Secchia Rapita. Written in ottava rima, his "poema eroicomico" consists of twelve substantial cantos and deals with the regional rivalry between Ghibbeline Modena and Guelph Bologna in the 14th century. To avoid giving offence in a still divided Italy, the book was first published from Paris under the name of Androvinci Melisone, but was soon afterwards reprinted in Venice with illustrations by Gasparo Salviani, and with the author’s real name.

The subject of Tassoni's poem was the war which the inhabitants of Modena declared against those of Bologna, on the refusal of the latter to restore to them some towns which had been occupied ever since the time of the Emperor Frederick II. The author mischievously made use of a popular tradition, according to which it was believed that a certain wooden bucket, kept in the treasury of Modena cathedral, came from Bologna, and that it had been forcibly taken away by the Modenese. Every episode of the poem, though beginning in the epic manner, ends in some hilarious absurdity.

The poem twice received operatic treatment under its original title. The first was Antonio Salieri's comic three-act La Secchia Rapita, first performed in Vienna in 1772. Then in 1910 the work was reinterpreted as an operetta by Giulio Ricordi under his musical pseudonym Jules Burgmein.

The battle of the books
Giovanni Mario Crescimbeni, in his Istoria della Volgar Poesia (1698), records his doubt whether the invention of the heroicomic poem ought to be ascribed to Tassoni, but instead to Francesco Bracciolini. Though the latter's Lo Scherno degli Dei (The Mockery of the Gods) was printed four years after La Secchia, he claimed in the epistle prefixed to it that he had written his some years earlier. Crescimbeni adds that, because Tassoni had severely ridiculed the Bolognese, Bartolomeo Bocchini (1604-1648/53), to revenge his countrymen, published from Venice in 1641 a poem in the same vein with the title Le Pazzie dei Savi  (The Madness of the Wise), or alternatively the Lambertaccio, in which the Modenese are spoken of with contempt.

Tassoni's mock-heroic manner was also found a fruitful model by Boileau, whose Le Lutrin (The Lectern, 1674-83) recounts a feud between the priest and the choirmaster of a French church. There the priest tries to position a reading-desk so as to obscure his rival from the sight of the congregation in a conflict that ends with champions of both sides gathering in a bookstore to pelt each other with books.

Boileau's work has been seen as the model for Alexander Pope's The Rape of the Lock. But the coincidence of a simultaneous translation of Tassoni's work by John Ozell has also led to the claim that La Secchia Rapita might have served Pope as a more direct model. Pope's poem originally appeared anonymously in 1712 and Ozell's translation of the first two cantos of La Secchia Rapita was published the following year as The Trophy Bucket: An heroi-comical poem. The first of the kind. Made English from the original Italian of Tassoni. Following the great success of Pope's expanded five-canto version of The Rape of the Lock in 1714, this time under his own name, Ozell's publisher seized the opportunity to profit from its popularity by retitling his translation The Rape of the Bucket in a "second edition" in 1715.

In 1825 the linguist James Atkinson published an ottava rima translation of the whole of Tassoni's poem. In his introduction, while acknowledging the general assumption that the poem is known "as the model upon which the Rape of the Lock of Pope, and the Lutrin of Boileau are conceived", goes on to comment that "there is little of similarity among them. The Secchia Rapita indeed differs essentially from the Rape of the Lock, both in spirit, and execution. There is nothing in the latter that can be compared with the humour of the former, or with the admirably grotesque pictures with which it abounds".

References

Cambridge History of Italian Literature ed. Brand and Pertile (1996) p. 310
The Salieri Album booklet notes to the recording by Cecilia Bartoli (Decca, 2003)

External links
Full Italian text at Liber Liber
 John A. Rice, "Salieri's La secchia rapita (1772): An Experiment in the Sustained Parody of Opera Seria"

Italian poems
1624 books
Mock-heroic poems